Laurie Olliff is a New Zealand rugby league player who represented New Zealand in the 1960 World Cup.

Playing career
Olliff played for Western United in the Auckland Rugby League competition. Western United were a combination of Mount Albert and Point Chevalier and won the Fox Memorial in 1959.

In 1960 he was selected for the New Zealand national rugby league team and played in two matches at the 1960 World Cup. He was part of the Auckland side that defended the Northern Union Cup in 1961.

References

Living people
New Zealand rugby league players
New Zealand national rugby league team players
Auckland rugby league team players
Rugby league locks
Year of birth missing (living people)